Orville and Wilbur is a 1971 American TV movie about the Wright brothers. It stars real-life brothers James Keach and Stacy Keach in the title roles. This gave them the idea to play Frank and Jesse James, which led to The Long Riders (1980).

See also
The Winds of Kitty Hawk (1978 film)

References

External links
The Wright Brothers at IMDb

1971 films
American television films
American aviation films
Cultural depictions of the Wright brothers
1970s American films